James Morton (19 January 1894 – 1 July 1916) was a Scottish footballer who played in the Scottish League for Kilmarnock as an inside left.

Personal life 
Morton served as a private in McCrae's Battalion of the Royal Scots during the First World War and was killed in the attack on the Sausage Redoubt on the first day on the Somme. He is commemorated on the Thiepval Memorial.

Career statistics

References 

Scottish footballers
Royal Scots soldiers
Scottish Football League players
Association football inside forwards
Kilmarnock F.C. players
McCrae's Battalion
Dunfermline Athletic F.C. players
Sportspeople from Cambuslang
British Army personnel of World War I
British military personnel killed in the Battle of the Somme
1894 births
1916 deaths
Scottish military personnel
Footballers from South Lanarkshire